Black Cypress may refer to:

Callitris endlicheri, an Australian tree commonly known as Black Cypress Pine  
Black Cypress, one of three areas of Big Cypress Bayou in Jefferson, Texas
Black Cypress (novel), a mystery novel by American writer Frances Crane